Valle Vista is an unincorporated community and census-designated place (CDP) in Mohave County, in the U.S. state of Arizona. The population was 1,802 at the 2020 census.

Geography
It is on the north side of Arizona State Route 66, former U.S. Route 66.

Demographics

References

Census-designated places in Mohave County, Arizona